Haribhai Parthibhai Chaudhary  is an Indian politician and was the Minister of State for Coal and Mines in government of India. He represents the Banaskantha constituency of Gujarat and is a member of the Bharatiya Janata Party political party.

Early life and education
Haribhai Chaudhary was born in village Jagana (in Banaskantha district, Gujarat). He has received MCom degree from Mumbai University. Prior to joining politics, Chaudhary was an Agriculturist and a Businessperson.

Political career
Haribhai Chaudhary joined Bharatiya Janata Party in late 1980s and held various party posts. He has been elected three terms as Member of Parliament from the Banaskantha constituency. Chaudhary contested and won the By-election in 2013 after the sitting MP Mukesh Gadhvi died of Brain stroke.

Posts Held

See also

12th Lok Sabha
13th Lok Sabha
15th Lok Sabha
Politics of India
Parliament of India
Government of India
Banaskantha (Lok Sabha constituency)
Bharatiya Janata Party

References 

India MPs 1998–1999
India MPs 1999–2004
India MPs 2009–2014
1954 births
Lok Sabha members from Gujarat
People from Banaskantha district
Living people
India MPs 2014–2019
Narendra Modi ministry
Bharatiya Janata Party politicians from Gujarat